Trapania palmula is a species of sea slug, a dorid nudibranch, a marine gastropod mollusc in the family Goniodorididae.

Distribution
This species was described from Luzon, Philippines. It is also found in Indonesia and southern Japan.

Description
This species of Trapania is unusual in having raised rounded tubercles all over the body. It is translucent white in colour with dense speckling of brown and some larger brown patches. The lateral papillae have a patch of white surrounding a blue diagonal streak.

Ecology
Trapania palmula feeds on Entoprocta which often grow on sponges and other living substrata.

References

External links
 

Goniodorididae
Gastropods described in 2008